The 1976–77 Roller Hockey Champions Cup was the 12th edition of the Roller Hockey Champions Cup organized by CERH.

Sporting CP achieved their first title ever.

Teams
The champions of the main European leagues, and Voltregà as title holders, played this competition, consisting in a double-legged knockout tournament. As Voltregà qualified also as Spanish champion, Vilanova joined also the competition.

Bracket

Source:

References

External links
 CERH website

1976 in roller hockey
1977 in roller hockey
Rink Hockey Euroleague